Zipp is a bicycle parts manufacturer.

Zipp may also refer to:
Zipp! (musical), a West End musical revue
Zip (roller coaster), a roller coaster at Oaks Amusement Park sometimes spelled "Zipp"

People with the surname
Bettina Zipp (born 1972), German former sprinter
Robbie Zipp (born 1963), American soccer player
Thomas Zipp (born 1966), German artist
Zipp., taxonomic author abbreviation for Alexander Zippelius (1797–1828), Dutch horticulturalist

Fictional characters
Zipp Storm, a main character in the fifth generation of My Little Pony

See also
Zip (disambiguation)
Zippe, a surname (and list of people with that name)
Zipper (disambiguation)
Zippy (disambiguation)